Avant Records was a record label in Japan that specialized in avant-garde jazz, avant rock, and experimental music. The label released more than 80 albums between 1992 and 2004.

History
New York saxophonist John Zorn was signed to Nonesuch, but his band Naked City recorded music that required a different label. He started Avant in 1992 as a division of DIW/Disk Union in Japan and produced its first albums.

The label's roster included Derek Bailey, Duck Baker, Cyro Baptista, Joey Baron, Steve Beresford, Anthony Coleman, Sylvie Courvoisier, Dave Douglas, Mark Feldman, Erik Friedlander, Wayne Horvitz, Joe Maneri, Misha Mengelberg, William Parker, Bobby Previte, and Min Xiao-Fen.

In 1995 Zorn and Kazunori Sugiyama started Tzadik Records in New York as a vehicle for Zorn's albums and for musicians who recorded for Avant.

Discography
 Avan 001: Naked City – Heretic
 Avan 002: Naked City – Grand Guignol
 Avan 003: Naked City – Radio
 Avan 004: Naked City – Absinthe
 Avan 005: Various Artists – In His Own Sweet Way: A Tribute to Dave Brubeck
 Avan 006: DNA – DNA (Last Live at CBGB's)
 Avan 007: Buckethead – Bucketheadland
 Avan 008: Fushitsusha – Allegorical Misunderstanding
 Avan 009: Anton Fier – Dreamspeed
 Avan 010: Blind Idiot God – Cyclotron
 Avan 011: Anthony Coleman – Disco by Night
 Avan 012: Peter Garland – Nana & Victorio
 Avan 013: David Shea – Shock Corridor
 Avan 014: George E. Lewis – Voyager
 Avan 015: Lee Hyla – In Double Light
 Avan 016: John Oswald – Plexure
 Avan 017: Rough Assemblage – Construction and Demolition
 Avan 018: Zeena Parkins – Isabelle
 Avan 019: Dave Soldier – SMUT
 Avan 020: David Weinstein – Perfume
 Avan 021: Min Xiaofen – With Six Composers
 Avan 022: Stephen Drury – Faith, The Loss of Faith, and the Return of Faith
 Avan 023: Romero Lubambo – Lubambo
 Avan 024: John French – O Solo Drumbo
 Avan 025: Naked City – Radio, Vol. 2 (Never Recorded)
 Avan 026: Boredoms – Wow 2
 Avan 027: Pigpen – V as in Victim
 Avan 028: James Plotkin – The Joy of Disease
 Avan 029: Cake Like – Delicious
 Avan 030: Ikue Mori – Painted Desert
 Avan 031: Various – Disco Bhangra: Wedding Bands From Rajasthan
 Avan 032: God Is My Co-Pilot – Mir Shlufn Nisht
 Avan 033: Marc Ribot – Shrek
 Avan 034: Z'EV – Heads & Tales
 Avan 035: Ben Goldberg – Twelve Minor
 Avan 036: Bobby Previte's Empty Suits – Slay the Suitors
 Avan 037: Phillip Johnston's Big Trouble – The Unknown
 Avan 038: Misha Mengelberg Trio – Who's Bridge
 Avan 039: Steve Beresford – Signals for Tea
 Avan 040: Duck Baker – Spinning Song: Duck Baker Plays the Music of Herbie Nichols
 Avan 041: Bob Ostertag – Fear No Love
 Avan 042: Chris Cochrane – Bath
 Avan 043: Weird Little Boy – Weird Little Boy
 Avan 044: Eugene Chadbourne – Pain Pen
 Avan 045: Jenny Scheinman Quartet – Live at Yoshi's
 Avan 046: Liu Sola & Wu Man – China Collage
 Avan 047: Smarnamisa! – Resia Valley Music
 Avan 048: Andy Haas – Arnhem Land
 Avan 049: Makigami Koichi – John Zorn's Cobra: Tokyo Operations '94
 Avan 050: Derek Bailey & Min Xiao–Fen – Viper
 Avan 051: Dim Sum Clip Job – Harmolodic Jeopardy
 Avan 052: Jad Fair & The Shapir–O'Rama – We Are The Rage
 Avan 053: Prelapse – Prelapse
 Avan 054: Pieces – I Need 5 Minutes Alone
 Avan 055: Larval – Larval
 Avan 056: Derek Bailey/John Zorn/William Parker – Harras
 Avan 057: Erik Friedlander – Chimera
 Avan 058: Arcado String Trio – Live in Europe
 Avan 059: Joey Baron & Barondown – Crackshot
 Avan 060: Derek Bailey – Guitar, Drums N Bass
 Avan 061: Cyro Baptista – Vira Loucos
 Avan 062: Drums of Death
 Avan 063: Bernard Woma – Live at the Pito Bar
 Avan 064: Abdulai Bangoura – Sigiri
 Avan 065: Mark Feldman & Sylvie Courvoisier – Music for Violin and Piano
 Avan 066: Dave Douglas – Sanctuary
 Avan 067: Joe Maneri – Paniots Nine
 Avan 068: Jamie Saft/Cuong Vu – Ragged Jack
 Avan 069: Bruce Ackley – The Hearing
 Avan 070: Marie McAuliffe – Plays the Music of Burt Bacharach
 Avan 071: Whistling Hangmen – Barhopping
 Avan 072: Alva – Fair-Haired Guilletine
 Avan 073: EasSide Percussion – ESP
 Avan 074: Keiji Haino– An Unclear Trial: More Than This
 Avan 075: Dragon Blue – Hades Park
 Avan 076: Dying Ground – Dying Ground
 Avan 077: David Watson – Skirl
 Avan 078: Harriet Tubman – Prototype (2000)
 Avan 079: Vivian Sisters – Vivian Sisters
 Avan 080: Wayne Horvitz Four Plus One Ensemble – From a Window
 Avan 081: Bill Laswell vs. Submerged (DJ) – Brutal Calling

References

Japanese independent record labels
Record labels established in 1992
Jazz record labels
Experimental music record labels